Chaff is dry inedible plant material.

Chaff may also refer to:

 Chaff (countermeasure), a radar countermeasure for aircraft or other targets
 Chaff algorithm, an algorithm for solving instances of the boolean satisfiability problem
 Chaffing and winnowing, a method in cryptography to protect a message without encryption
 Chaff (newspaper), a former students' newspaper of Massey University Students' Association

See also
 "Gumbo Chaff" or "Gombo Chaff", an American song 
 Chaff cutter, a mechanical device for cutting straw or hay